Acronicta grisea, the gray dagger, is a moth of the family Noctuidae. The species was first described by Francis Walker in 1856. It is found from the Atlantic to the Pacific coast in southern Canada and the northern United States.

The wingspan is 30–40 mm. Adults are on wing in midsummer.

Subspecies
Acronicta grisea grisea
Acronicta grisea revellata

External links

Acronicta
Moths of North America
Moths described in 1856